Fernandópolis Futebol Clube, commonly referred to as Fernandópolis, is a Brazilian professional football club based in Fernandópolis, São Paulo. The club competes in the Campeonato Paulista Segunda Divisão, the fourth division in the São Paulo state football league system.

History
The club was founded on November 15, 1961. They won the Campeonato Paulista Segunda Divisão in 1979 and in 1994.

Achievements

 Campeonato Paulista Segunda Divisão:
 Winners (2): 1979, 1994

Stadium
Fernandópolis Futebol Clube play their home games at Estádio Municipal Cláudio Rodante, nicknamed Estádio Ninho da Águia. The stadium has a maximum capacity of 7,850 people.

References

Association football clubs established in 1961
Football clubs in São Paulo (state)
1961 establishments in Brazil
Futebol Clube